Hackberry High School is a K-12 school located in Hackberry, Louisiana. It is part of the Cameron Parish School Board.

Athletics
Hackberry High athletics competes in the LHSAA. The male and female teams are the Mustangs and Lady Mustangs respectively.

References

External links

Public K-12 schools in Louisiana
Public high schools in Louisiana
Schools in Cameron Parish, Louisiana